Anna University of Technology may refer to:
Anna University of Technology, Chennai
Anna University of Technology, Coimbatore
Anna University of Technology, Madurai
Anna University of Technology, Tiruchirappalli
Anna University of Technology Tirunelveli